Otoglossa is a genus of beetles in the family Carabidae, containing the following species:

 Otoglossa nevermanni (Liebke, 1927)
 Otoglossa subviolacea Mateu, 1961
 Otoglossa tuberculosa Chaudoir, 1872

References

Lebiinae